Events in the year 885 in Japan.

Incumbents
Monarch: Kōkō

Births
January 18 – Emperor Daigo (died 930)

References

885
9th century in Japan